Bjørn Lofterød (born 17 June 1949) is a Norwegian sailor. He was born in Oslo, and was a brother of Odd Roar Lofterød. He competed in the 1972 Summer Olympics in Munich.

References

External links

1949 births
Living people
Sportspeople from Oslo
Olympic sailors of Norway
Norwegian male sailors (sport)
Sailors at the 1968 Summer Olympics – Flying Dutchman
Sailors at the 1972 Summer Olympics – Star
Soling class sailors